Inheritance is the transferring of property and debt upon a death to a beneficiary.

Inheritance, or The Inheritance, may also refer to:

Computer science
 Inheritance (genetic algorithm) 
 Inheritance (object-oriented programming)

Films
 The Inheritance, American title of the 1947 British film Uncle Silas
 The Inheritance (1976 film), an Italian drama by Mauro Bolognini
 The Inheritance or Fuckoffguysgoodday, a 1992 Czech comedy film by Věra Chytilová
 The Inheritance (1997 film), an American television film starring Meredith Baxter and Tom Conti
 Inheritance (2001 film), an Argentine drama by Paula Hernández
 The Inheritance (2003 film), also known as Arven in Danish, by Per Fly
 Inheritance (2006 film), documentary by James Moll about the daughter of a concentration camp commandant
 The Inheritance (2007 film), a Scottish road movie
 Inheritance (2012 film), by Hiam Abbass
 The Inheritance (2014 film), a documentary about Huntington's disease
 Inheritance (2020 film), by Vaughn Stein
 The Inheritance (2020 film), see

Music

Albums
 Inheritance (Hobbs' Angel of Death album), 1995
 Inheritance, a 2013 album by The Last Bison
 Inheritance (Audrey Assad album), 2016

Songs
 “Inheritance”, by Scorpions from Lonesome Crow, later covered by Iron Christ
 “Inheritance”, by Talk Talk from Spirit of Eden, later covered by Recoil
 “Inheritance”, by New Model Army from Thunder and Consolation
 “Inheritance”, by Prong from the Airheads soundtrack
 “Inheritance”, by John van Tongeren from Poltergeist: The Legacy
 “Inheritance”, by Katatonia from Night Is the New Day
 “The Inheritance (Green)”, by The Dear Hunter from The Color Spectrum

Literature

Science fiction and fantasy
 The Inheritance (novel), 2001, in the Dragonlance Dungeon & Dragons setting
 The Inheritance Cycle, a series of young-adult novels by Christopher Paolini
 Inheritance (Paolini novel), 2011
 Inheritance (Savile novel), 2006, set in the Warhammer 40,000 universe
 "Inheritance" (short story), a 1947 supernatural sci-fi story by Arthur C. Clarke

Plays
 Inheritance (play), 2003, by Hannie Rayson, set in Australia
 The Inheritance (play), 2018, by Matthew Lopez

Other books
 Inheritance (memoir), autobiography of American novelist Dani Shapiro
 The Inheritance, 1849 (first published 1997),  Louisa May Alcott novel
 Inheritance, a 1932 novel by Phyllis Bentley
 The Inheritance, a 2005 translation of a novel by Palestinian writer Sahar Khalifeh

Television
 Inheritance (TV series), a 1967 British series
 "Inheritance" (Arrow), a 2019 episode
 “Inheritance” (Star Trek: The Next Generation episode), first aired 1993
 "The Inheritance" (Lassie episode), a 1954 premiere
 "The Inheritance" (Mad Men), a 2008 television episode

See also 
 
 Biological inheritance
 Heritability
 Inheritor (disambiguation)
 Herencia (disambiguation)